The West Coast Main Line is a key strategic railway line in the United Kingdom. It links the cities of London, Glasgow, Birmingham, Liverpool, Manchester and Preston. Virgin Trains took on the franchise to run train services on the routes in 1997 and as part of the agreement wanted an upgrade to the railway line to allow for faster more frequent trains to grow the business. The upgrade started in 1998 and was completed in 2009. It came under parliamentary and media scrutiny because of cost and schedule overruns. Further improvements such as the Norton Bridge rail flyover were completed after these dates. The project is sometimes given the acronym WCRM - West Coast Route Modernisation.

Previous modernisations 
In the middle of the twentieth century the line was upgraded substantially as part of the 1955 Modernisation Plan. Further electrification was discussed in 1968.
The line north of Crewe was modernised by further electrification from Weaver Junction to Glasgow in the 1970s. Some innovative electronics technology were used on the project including lighter catenary and extensive use of headspans.
The Advanced Passenger Train concept was in effect a part of that upgrade. It relied on tilting trains to increase speed on the route rather than major civil engineering interventions.

Post privatisation modernisation 
The late 20th and early 21st century modernisation began without public sector involvement but with Railtrack. However, the Strategic Rail Authority was concerned about cost overruns. Railtrack asked the government for more money to complete the project but the Labour Party Secretary of State for Transport Stephen Byers put the company into liquidation. This and other problems with this project and its cost and time overruns, is usually considered the cause of the liquidation of Railtrack. In 2002 Bechtel were invited to join the project. The upgrade went substantially over budget. Regular updates were then conducted by the UK Parliament accounts department. The Strategic Rail Authority published a document in June 2003 which re-examined and clarified many of the assumptions and specified the direction and scope of the whole project.

Technical aspects 
The upgrade involved:
 Major remodeling of Rugby railway station
 Proof House Junction in Birmingham was also remodelled. 
 Many Level crossings were either removed or modernised - 77 in total.
 Over 800 points, switches and crossings renewed, improved or removed
 Overhead line renewals
 Power supply upgrade to autotransformer system
 Track renewals- 430 miles
 Over 2000 signals modified or renewed with better line of sight etc.
 Quadrifying the two track section in the Trent Valley including TAME viaduct

Benefits 
The benefits of the project are claimed to be capacity improvements, journey time reductions of up to 28% in some cases and improved safety. Although Virgin Trains were part of the driver for the project, the client is actually listed as the Department for Transport. The length of the project was just short of 11 years (110 months) and the final contract cost of approximately 9 billion pounds. The Campaign for Better Transport (United Kingdom) has stated that the benefits are 1) Road congestion reduction. 2) Carbon emissions reduction. 3) Economic and 4)Passenger benefits. It is claimed it was part of the reason that the BBC decided to move its main operations from London to the north.

Capacity enhancements 
The Campaign for Better Transport (United Kingdom) in their paper entitled "Transformation of the West Coast Main Line" stated there are 40% more long distance services overall. There are 25% more between London and Scotland; 50% more between London and Birmingham and 150% more between London and Manchester.

Safety 
The removal and reduction of level crossings during the modernisation was one factor in improving the safety. A spokesperson for UK Railway Inspectorate made the statement in 2004 that "level crossings create the greatest potential for catastrophic risk on the railways". Other crossings were also removed with subsequent reduction and modernisation of the overhead line. This also reduced maintenance costs.

Road Congestion 
Road congestion reduction has been harder to quantify but modeling that has been done suggests 26,000 less car journeys on the M1 and M40 motorways as a direct result along with as many as 7 million less car journeys between the cities of London and Manchester.

Environment/Carbon emissions 
On the London to Manchester route alone between 2009 and 2017, the modernisation resulted in a 77% increase in rail passengers; 23,000 tonnes of carbon saving and a 27% reduction in air passengers. The air passenger reduction was between Manchester and Heathrow, Gatwick, Stanstead and London City Airports. The number of flights between cities served by the WCML declined 67% since 2004 pre-COVID.

Passenger benefits 
In addition to journey time reductions, another result of the modernisation was an increase in capacity such that a 20 minute frequency of trains (3 per hour) between London and Manchester and London and Birmingham at key hours resulted.

Issues - future work still needed 
During modernisation, much of the signaling was renewed and concentrated in Rugby. However, money ran out and so the south end of the line still uses Wembley which controls assets that fail frequently. This point of failure will need to be addressed in the future.

2020 onwards ongoing improvements 

Carstairs has long being considered a bottleneck on the WCML and improvements including signaling, track renewal and other work finished in October 2022. Further work will continue in 2023 which will include work on the drains and also embankments.

Timeline

See also 
 21st-century modernisation of the Great Western Main Line
 Felixstowe–Nuneaton railway upgrade
 High Speed 2
 History of rail transport in Great Britain 1995 to date
 Midland Main Line railway upgrade
 North West England electrification schemes
 Overhead line
 Railway electrification in Scotland
 Transpennine north railway upgrade

References

Further reading

External websites 
 Electric All The Way – 1974 British Rail information booklet about the completion of electrification to Glasgow.
 Rail Industry Web page monitoring progress of the project
 Department of Transport – 2006 – West Coast Main Line – Update Report

Main inter-regional railway lines in Great Britain
Railway lines in North West England
Transport policy in the United Kingdom
Virgin Trains
Railway upgrades in the United Kingdom